is a Japanese gravure idol who is affiliated with K-point. She won the 2008 Miss Magazine Special Jury Prize.

Filmography

TV series

Films

References

External links
 Official profile at K-point  

Japanese gravure idols
21st-century Japanese actresses
1992 births
Living people
People from Neyagawa, Osaka
Models from Osaka Prefecture